Philip H. Gordon (born 1962) is an American diplomat and foreign policy professional. Since March 21, 2022, he has served as Assistant to the President and National Security Advisor to the Vice President of the United States, Kamala Harris. Earlier in his career, he was Assistant Secretary of State for European and Eurasian Affairs (2009–2011) and Special Assistant to the President and White House Coordinator for the Middle East, North Africa, and the Persian Gulf Region (2013–2015) during the presidency of Barack Obama.

Education
Gordon received his bachelor's degree from Ohio University in 1984 and went on to study at Johns Hopkins University School of Advanced International Studies (SAIS), receiving a master's degree in 1987 and a doctorate in 1991.

Career

Teaching career
Gordon held a number of research and teaching positions, including at the Brookings Institution in Washington, D.C.; the International Institute for Strategic Studies in London; INSEAD, the global graduate business school in Fontainebleau; the Institut d’Etudes Politiques (“Sciences Po”) in Paris; and the Deutsche Gesellschaft für Auswärtige Politik in Bonn.

Clinton administration
From 1998 to 1999, he served as the Director for European Affairs at the National Security Council under President Bill Clinton.

Obama administration
From 2013 to 2015, Gordon served as Special Assistant to the President and White House Coordinator for the Middle East, North Africa, and the Gulf Region. Prior to joining the National Security Council staff, he served as Assistant Secretary of State for European and Eurasian Affairs under Secretary of State Hillary Clinton from May 2009 to March 2013. During his time as Assistant Secretary, Gordon prioritized cooperation with Europe on global issues; promoting U.S. commercial and business interests; extending stability, prosperity and democracy to Eastern Europe, the Balkans and the Caucasus; and developing bilateral cooperation with Russia and with Turkey.

Council on Foreign Relations

Between the Obama and Biden administrations, Gordon worked as the Mary and David Boies senior fellow in U.S. foreign policy at the Council on Foreign Relations, where he focused on U.S. foreign policy, the Middle East, and Europe.  He was also a Senior Adviser at Albright Stonebridge Group.

He joined the Council on Foreign Relations in April 2015 as a senior fellow focused on U.S. foreign and national security policy; U.S. policy in the Middle East; Israeli-Palestinian issues; Middle East regional issues; Europe and the EU; Russia; Turkey; nuclear weapons; intelligence; terrorism; and international economics.

Biden administration
On January 16, 2021, then President-elect Joe Biden and Vice President-elect Kamala Harris announced that Gordon would be named Deputy National Security Advisor to the Vice President. On March 21, 2022, press reports indicated that Gordon would succeed Nancy McEldowney as National Security Advisor to the Vice President.

Publications
Gordon has published articles in The New York Times, Washington Post, Politico, the Atlantic, Financial Times, Wall Street Journal, Foreign Affairs, Foreign Policy, Le Monde, and elsewhere.

He has also authored several books, including:
Losing the Long Game: The False Promise of Regime Change in the Middle East, 2020
Winning the Right War: The Path to Security for America and the World, 2008
Winning Turkey: How America, Europe, And Turkey Can Revive A Fading Partnership (with Omer Taspinar), 2008
History Strikes Back: How States, Nations, And Conflicts Are Shaping The Twenty-first Century, ed., (with Hubert Vedrine and Madeleine Albright), 2008
Crescent of Crisis: US-European Strategy for the Middle East, ed., (with Ivo Daalder and Nicole Gnesotto), 2006
Allies at War: The United States, Europe, and the Crisis Over Iraq (with Jeremy Shapiro), 2004
The French Challenge: Adapting to Globalization (with Sophie Meunier), 2001
Cold War Statesmen Confront the Bomb, ed. (with John Lewis Gaddis, Ernest R. May and Jonathan Rosenberg), 1999
NATO's Transformation, ed., 1997
France, Germany and the Western Alliance, 1995
A Certain Idea of France, 1993

He has also translated two books: Nicolas Sarkozy's Testimony: France, Europe, and the World in the Twenty-First Century, 2007, and Hubert Vedrine's France in the Age of Globalization, 2001.

References

External links

Living people
United States Assistant Secretaries of State
Brookings Institution people
Johns Hopkins University alumni
Ohio University alumni
International relations scholars
1962 births
Academic staff of INSEAD
United States National Security Council staffers
Biden administration personnel
Obama administration personnel
Clinton administration personnel